Denis Vladimirovich Vavilin (born 4 July 1982) is a former Russian footballer.

Club career
He made his Russian Premier League debut for FC Krylia Sovetov Samara on 13 October 2001 in a game against FC Spartak Moscow.

External links
 

1982 births
Sportspeople from Samara, Russia
Living people
Russian footballers
Association football goalkeepers
PFC Krylia Sovetov Samara players
Russian Premier League players
FC KAMAZ Naberezhnye Chelny players
FC Volga Nizhny Novgorod players
FC Yenisey Krasnoyarsk players
FC Tambov players
FC Tom Tomsk players
FC Nosta Novotroitsk players